Bradford College was a college in the part of Haverhill, Massachusetts, that was once the town of Bradford.  Founded in 1803, Bradford College began as Bradford Academy, one of New England's earliest coeducational institutions. In 1836 Bradford chose to devote itself exclusively to the education of women. By 1932, the school had grown from a secondary school and became Bradford Junior College. In 1971 Bradford was authorized to grant bachelor's degrees. The new Bradford College began admitting men again that same year. Bradford College focused on the creative arts and social sciences with one of the oldest alum associations in the country.

On November 19, 1999, its board of trustees announced that the 197-year-old liberal arts institution would close in May 2000. The campus currently is the home of Northpoint Bible College.

History
Bradford College traces its origins to Bradford Academy, which was founded in 1803, making it the 3rd oldest post-secondary institution in Massachusetts behind Harvard University and Williams College before becoming defunct in 2000. The academy was incorporated in 1804. Many of Bradford's early graduates became Christian missionaries. The first president of Bradford was Katharine Denworth, a graduate of Swarthmore with a doctorate from Columbia. Her tenure from 1927 to 1939 oversaw the transformation of Bradford in 1932 into a liberal arts junior college for women leading to a bachelor's degree. With degrees in classics from Oberlin and Smith, scholar Dorothy M. Bell became president in 1940. Over the ensuing 27 years, Bell led Bradford Junior College through World War II and to national and international prestige as a two-year liberal arts private women's college, retiring in 1967. The college became coeducational, and the name changed to Bradford College in 1971.

During the 1990s, annual budget shortfalls of more than $1 million, combined with declining enrollment and revenues and resulting losses due to competition from larger regional institutions, sealed the school's fate. In 1997, the school incurred an $18 million debt when it refinanced old debt and sought funds to build new dormitories.

After 197 years, Bradford College was closed in 2000, leaving substantial debt. In late 2007, the remaining endowment of $3.6 million was awarded to Hampshire College, an alternative liberal arts college in Amherst, Massachusetts.  With the closing, 33 full-time professors and 133 employees, were left without jobs.

Property sold

According to the Assemblies of God denomination, an affiliate of Hobby Lobby stores (founder: David Green) purchased the former Bradford College campus in 2007. Renovation needed to be done before a new school opened on the campus. An estimated $5 million worth of repairs and upgrades were needed before the shuttered campus reopened for the fall semester of 2008. Green and his affiliates covered the cost of repairs. The , multimillion-dollar campus, was then given to Zion Bible College, the Assemblies of God Bible school previously located at the former campus of the Barrington College in Barrington, Rhode Island.

Notable alumni
 George H. Atkinson, missionary in Oregon
 Sarah Charlesworth, artist
 Alice Blanchard Coleman, missionary society leader and writer
 Andre Dubus III, author, son of Bradford faculty Andre Dubus; attended briefly
 Esther Forbes, author of Johnny Tremain and other works
 Ann Hasseltine Judson, 19th-century Christian missionary to Asia
 John Taylor Jones, early missionary to Thailand
 Nayef Samhat, president of Wofford College
 Lucy Goodale Thurston, 19th-century Christian Hawaiian missionary
 Portia Washington Pittman, daughter of Booker T. Washington & the institution's first African-American graduate

Notable faculty
Douglas Huebler, artist
Andre Dubus, writer
Marion Coats Graves

Notes and references

External links
 Bradford College Alumni Association

Buildings and structures in Haverhill, Massachusetts
Educational institutions established in 1804
Educational institutions disestablished in 2000
Defunct private universities and colleges in Massachusetts
Former women's universities and colleges in the United States
1804 establishments in Massachusetts
2000 disestablishments in Massachusetts